Akinpelu Oludele Adesola (6 November 1927 – 29 May 2010) was a Nigerian  professor of Surgery, educational administrator and former  vice chancellor of the University of Lagos.

His father was Chief Bamgboye Fasina Adesola MBE, (Bariyun of Isaga and Bajito of Ibara, Abeokuta). In 1935 he joined Saint Jude's School in Ebute-Metta, Lagos  where he was actively involved in the Sunday School Choir.  The Adesola household which had a strong Christian foundation was filled with music lovers who enjoyed, played and sang church hymns.

References

See also
Babatunde Kwaku Adadevoh
List of vice chancellors in Nigeria
University of Lagos

1927 births
2010 deaths
People from Lagos
University of Ibadan alumni
Alumni of Queen's University Belfast
Academics of Queen's University Belfast
Academic staff of the University of Lagos
Yoruba academics
University of Rochester faculty
Nigerian expatriate academics in the United States
Vice-Chancellors of the University of Lagos
Residents of Lagos